Derham may refer to:

People with the surname:
 Brigid Derham (1943–1980), British artist  
 Sir David Derham (1920–1985), Australian jurist and university administrator
 Enid Derham (1882–1941), Australian poet and academic
 Frederick Derham (1844–1922), Australian politician
 James Derham (c.1757–1802?), the first African-American to formally practice medicine in the United States
 James M. Derham, American diplomat
 Katie Derham (born 1970), English newscaster and presenter
 Michael Derham (1889–1923), Irish politician
 Sir Peter Derham (1925–2008), Australian business executive and philanthropist
 Thomas Derham (died 1444/5), English politician
 William Derham (1657–1735), English clergyman and natural philosopher
 Zoe Derham (born 1980), English hammer thrower
Patrick Derham OBE (born 1959), Headmaster of Westminster School

Company:
 Derham Body Company, American coachbuilder

See also
Dereham (disambiguation)
Durham (disambiguation)
Dyrham, village in Gloucestershire, England